Hancock Lee Jackson (May 12, 1796March 19, 1876) was an American lawyer and politician who served as the 13th Governor of Missouri in 1857.

Biography
Jackson was born in Madison County, Kentucky on May 12, 1796. He was educated in the county schools and became a farmer. Hancock Lee’s father was John Jackson and his brother was Jarvis Jackson Jr. John and Jarvis Jr. later sold the land that would become Laurel County, Kentucky. He moved to Missouri in 1821, and continued to farm.  In 1829 he entered politics as a Democrat when he became sheriff of Randolph County, a position he held for two terms. He also served as a delegate to the 1845 Missouri Constitutional Convention,

During the Mexican–American War, he raised a company of volunteers and was elected commander with the rank of captain. As part of Sterling Price's 2nd Regiment, Missouri Volunteer Cavalry, he served primarily in New Mexico, and fought in campaigns in Taos, including the Taos Revolt.

Jackson served in the Missouri State Senate from 1851 to 1855, and was Lieutenant Governor from 1857 to 1861. In February 1857 Governor Trusten Polk resigned to accept election to the United States Senate, and Jackson acted as Governor pending the selection of a new Governor in a special election. Robert Marcellus Stewart won the October contest to complete Polk's term, and Jackson resumed his duties as Lieutenant Governor.

In 1860 he ran unsuccessfully for Governor, losing to Claiborne Fox Jackson. Claiborne Fox Jackson, the 15th governor of Missouri, is Hancock Lee Jackson’s 3rd cousin. The two share a great grandfather, Joseph Jackson Sr. Jackson was then appointed United States Marshal for the Western District of Missouri, a post he held until Republican nominee Abraham Lincoln won the presidency in 1860 and replaced federal appointees with members of his own party after being inaugurated in 1861.

Jackson moved to Oregon in 1865, where he continued to farm. He died in Salem on March 19, 1876, and was buried in Salem Pioneer Cemetery.

References
Hancock Lee Jackson at National Governors Association
Hancock Lee Jackson at Dictionary of Missouri Biography
Hancock Lee Jackson at Missouri Digital Heritage
Hancock Lee Jackson at Salem Pioneer Cemetery

Democratic Party governors of Missouri
1796 births
1876 deaths
People from Richmond, Kentucky
People from Randolph County, Missouri
Politicians from Salem, Oregon
Democratic Party Missouri state senators
Lieutenant Governors of Missouri
American military personnel of the Mexican–American War
American militia officers
Burials at Salem Pioneer Cemetery
19th-century American politicians
Lawyers from Salem, Oregon
19th-century American lawyers
Military personnel from Oregon